Mehran Broumand (Persian: مهران برومند، born in April 1974) is an Iranian producer and director.

Career 
Borumand started his artistic activity with following works. he was take part in several films and TV series in Iran:

 As a director group in Mojassame movie in 1992 directed by Ebrahim Vahid zadeh
 programming manager in Paeez-E-Boland drama serie directed by Manocher Asgarinasab 1992-1994
 As a directing group in Hamle Be H3 in 1994 movie
 As a director,s first assistant in Lak Posht movie in 1996
 As a director,s first assistant and programming manager in Istgah drama series directed by Manochehr Asgari nasab in 1997
 Programming manager in The Men of Angelos drama serie directed by Farjollah Salahshoor in 1998
 Direstor,s first assistant and programming manager in Parvandehaye Majool drama serie directed by Jamal Shorjeh
 Dirsctor,s first assistant in Gharche Sammi movie in 2001
 Director,s first assistant and programming manager Tofang sarpor 1999-2001 directed by Amarollah Ahmadju
 Director,s first assistant Shahe Khamoosh movie 2002
 Director,s first assistant in Roozhaye Be Yad Mandani in two seasons, 2003-2005 directed by Homayun SHahnavz and Tooraj Mansoori
 Director,s first Assistant in Enekas movie, in 2008

Filmography

Television 
 The Men of Angelos (1998)
 Parvandehaye Majool (2001)
 Tofang sarpor (2001)
 Roozhaye Be Yad Mandani (2005)
 Mokhtarnameh (2010)
 Intoxicated by Love (2023)

Film 
 Mojassame (1992)
 Paeez-E-Boland (1994)
 Lak Posht (1996)
 Istgah (1997)
 Gharche Sammi (2001)
 Shahe Khamoosh (2001)
 Enekas (2008)
 Golden Tooth (2015)

See also 
 Iranian New Wave
 Cinema of Iran

References 

Iranian film directors
1974 births
Living people